Kiick is a surname. Notable people with the surname include:

Allie Kiick (born 1995), American tennis player
George Kiick (1917–2002), American football player
Jim Kiick (1946–2020), American football player
Kristi Kiick (born 1967), American professor